Louis Joseph Xavier François (22 October 1781 – 4 June 1789) was Dauphin of France as the second child and first son of King Louis XVI and Marie Antoinette. As son of a king of France, he was a fils de France ("Child of France"). Louis Joseph died at the age of seven from tuberculosis and was succeeded as Dauphin (and thus heir-apparent) by his four-year-old brother Louis Charles.

Biography
Louis Joseph Xavier François de France was born at the Palace of Versailles on 22 October 1781. He was named after his maternal uncle, Joseph II. The new-born was the long-awaited Dauphin, his father's heir to the throne of France, as the Salic Law, which excluded women from acceding the throne, applied to his elder sister, Marie Thérèse Charlotte, Madame Royale. The birth of Louis Joseph ruined the hopes of his uncle, the comte de Provence, of succeeding his brother Louis XVI.

His private household was created upon his birth. He was under the care of Victoire de Rohan, the Governess of the Children of France, until she was replaced in 1782 by Yolande de Polastron, duchesse de Polignac, one of his mother's favourites. His sous-gouverneur was the Maréchal de camp Antoine Charles Augustin d'Allonville. His wet nurse was Geneviève Poitrine, who was later accused of transmitting tuberculosis to the young Dauphin.

Louis Joseph was very close to his sister and to his parents, who watched attentively over his education. He was always praised for being a very bright child for his age; however, it soon became apparent that he was of fragile health.

Illness

Around April 1784, when he was three years old, Louis Joseph had a series of high fevers. Out of fear for his health, he was transported to the Château de La Muette where the air was reputed to have healing properties. The time spent at La Muette seemed to have helped Louis Joseph recover, and almost a year later, in March 1785, he returned there and was inoculated against smallpox. However, his health remained fragile.

In 1786, the fevers returned, but his household regarded them as being of no importance. These fevers, however, were the first signs of tuberculosis. In the same year, Louis Joseph's education was turned over to men, as was customary for the sons of the kings of France. At the ceremony, it was noted that Louis Joseph had trouble walking, which was in fact caused by a curvature of the spine – something which was treated through the use of metal corsets. By January 1788 the fevers grew more frequent and the disease progressed quickly.

Louis Joseph died at the Château de Meudon on 4 June 1789, at the age of seven and a half, during the Estates General. He was buried on 13 June in a simple ceremony at the Basilica of St Denis. On 10 August 1793, on order of the National Convention during the Reign of Terror, his tomb was desecrated, together with those of the kings and queens of France, members of the royal family, high dignitaries, and abbots.

At the death of Louis Joseph, the title of Dauphin passed to his younger brother Louis Charles, Duke of Normandy (1785–1795), who died during the French Revolution, at the Temple prison in Paris.

Legacy

Dauphin County, Pennsylvania, in which Harrisburg is located, is named after him. The Pennsylvania legislature, meeting in Philadelphia in 1785, named the newly formed county northwest of Lancaster and north of York to thank France for helping the United States win her independence from the British Empire. Within the county, the borough of Dauphin, so named when it was incorporated in 1845, is thus indirectly also named for him.

Ancestry

References

Bibliography
History of Dauphin County, Pennsylvania Historical Commission, Harrisburg, Pennsylvania

|-

Princes of France (Bourbon)
Heirs apparent who never acceded
Louis-Joseph of France, Prince
1781 births
1789 deaths
French Roman Catholics
Tuberculosis deaths in France
Burials at the Basilica of Saint-Denis
Dauphins of France
Children of Louis XVI
Royalty and nobility who died as children
Sons of kings